The men's 30 metre dueling pistol (originally called individual competition with revolver and pistol (duel shooting)) was a shooting sports pistol event held as part of the 1912 Summer Olympics shooting programme. It was later standardized by the ISSF to the men's 25 metre rapid fire pistol. It was the third appearance of the event (fourth counting 1906), as it had not been featured at the 1908 Games. The competition was held on Saturday, 29 June 1912. Forty-two sport shooters from ten nations competed. Nations were limited to 12 shooters each. The event was won by Alfred Lane of the United States, in the nation's debut. Sweden, also making its debut, earned the silver (Paul Palén) and bronze (Johan Hübner von Holst) medals.

Background

This was the third appearance of what would become standardised as the men's ISSF 25 meter rapid fire pistol event, the only event on the 2020 programme that traces back to 1896. The event has been held at every Summer Olympics except 1904 and 1928 (when no shooting events were held) and 1908; it was open to women from 1968 to 1980. The 1912 event was very different from both the 1896 event and the 1900 event, which were also quite different from each other. Standardization would come in 1924.

France, Great Britain, and Greece each made their second appearance in the event; each of the other seven nations (Austria, Chile, Germany, Hungary, Russia, Sweden, and the United States) was competing for the first time.

Competition format

The format was 30 shots in 6 series of 5 shots each. The target was a 1.7 metre tall full silhouette, with scoring rings up to 10 points. The figure would appear for 3 seconds, with 10 seconds between each shot. 30 hits were possible, with 300 points possible. Hits were the primary measurement of success; points were only used to differentiate between shooters with the same number of hits. Any revolver or pistol could be used, with open fore- and back-sights.

Schedule

Results

A shoot-off was used to determine the bronze medal after two men tied on hits (30) and points (283). Hübner von Holst beat Dietz 284 to 282. Tie-breaking procedures for later ties are not known.

References

External links
 
 

Shooting at the 1912 Summer Olympics
Men's 1896